Fredrick or Fred Petersen may refer to:

Frederick Petersen, American physiotherapist and politician
Fred Petersen, Samoan rugby player
Fred A. Petersen, American architect

See also
Frederick Peterson (disambiguation)